Brida is a town and commune in Laghouat Province, Algeria. According to the 1998 census, it has a population of 5,742.

References

Communes of Laghouat Province